Termessa diplographa is a moth of the subfamily Arctiinae first described by Turner in 1899. It is found in Australia.

References

Lithosiini
Moths described in 1899